Events from the year 1928 in Denmark.

Incumbents
 Monarch – Christian X
 Prime minister – Thomas Madsen-Mygdal

Events
 20 March – Haandarbejdets Fremme is founded.
 21 September – The 1928 Landsting election is held.

Date unknown
 Dronningborg Boldklub football club is established.

Sports
28 July – 12 August – Denmark wins three gold medals, one silver medal and two bronze medals at the 1928 Summer Olympics.

Births
 3 August – Henning Moritzen, actor (died 2012)
 4 October – Torben Ulrich, tennis player, writer, musician, filmmaker
 7 November – Grethe Krogh, organist and professor (died 2018)

Deaths
 13 January – Johan Peter Koch, captain and arctic explorer (born 1870)
 2 July – Anton Rosen, architect (born 1859)
 6 October – Peter Hansen, painter (born 1868)

References

 
Denmark
Years of the 20th century in Denmark
1920s in Denmark
1928 in Europe